Ruaraka Constituency is an electoral constituency located in Nairobi County, Kenya. It is one of seventeen constituencies in the County. The constituency has a population of 192,620  and covers an area of 7.20 km². It was formed for the 2013 election following proposals by the Independent Electoral and Boundaries Commission which sought to ease political tensions during elections. Ruaraka Constituency was formerly part of Kasarani Constituency.

Locations and wards 
There are five wards in Ruaraka. The population statistics given below are as of 2009.

Members of Parliament

References

Constituencies in Nairobi
2013 establishments in Kenya
Constituencies established in 2013